Pyotr Gennadyevich Devyatkin (8 March 1977 – 10 September 2016) was a Kazakhstani ice hockey forward.

Career
He competed for Kazakhstan at the 1998 Winter Olympics, where his team placed fifth. At the club level Devyatkin mostly played in Russia, and after retiring from competitions worked as an ice hockey coach in Poronaysk. 

He presumably committed suicide in Novosibirsk at the age 39.

Career statistics

Regular season and playoffs

International

References

External links
 
 

1977 births
2016 suicides
Amur Khabarovsk players
HC Dinamo Minsk players
Dizel Penza players
HC Dynamo Moscow players
Ice hockey players at the 1998 Winter Olympics
HC Izhstal players
HC Neftekhimik Nizhnekamsk players
Olympic ice hockey players of Kazakhstan
Salavat Yulaev Ufa players
HC Spartak Moscow players
Sportspeople from Oskemen
Suicides by hanging in Russia
Asian Games gold medalists for Kazakhstan
Medalists at the 1999 Asian Winter Games
Asian Games medalists in ice hockey
Ice hockey players at the 1999 Asian Winter Games
2016 deaths